Intelsat 705 (also known as IS-705 and Intelsat 7-F5) is a geostationary communication satellite that was built by Space Systems/Loral (SSL). It is located in the orbital position of 29.5 degrees west longitude and it is currently in an inclined orbit. The same is owned by Intelsat. The satellite was based on the LS-1300 platform and its estimated useful life was 15 years.

The satellite was successfully launched into space on March 22, 1995, at 06:18, using an Atlas IIAS vehicle from the Cape Canaveral Air Force Station, United States. It had a launch mass of 3,695 kg.

The Intelsat 705 is equipped with 26 transponders in C band and 10 in Ku band to provide broadcasting, business-to-home services, telecommunications, VSATnetworks.

See also

 1995 in spaceflight

External links 
 Intelsat 705 TBS satellite
 Intelsat 7 Gunter's Space Page
 Intelsat 705 SatBeams

References 

Spacecraft launched in 1995
Intelsat satellites